Brian Routh (9 March 1948) is a British performance and sound artist. He is known for his performance work with Martin von Haselberg as one of The Kipper Kids who became notorious for their rowdy and rebellious performances in the art world; influencing the punk movement and the inspiration for such acts as Blue Man Group, Karen Finley and Paul McCarthy. The Kipper Kids performed throughout Europe, North Africa, United Kingdom, North America and Canada. They also worked on a number of projects for HBO and Cinemax as well as cameos in various movies.
In addition to the Kipper Kids, Brian has performed as a solo act and collaborated with other performers and artists. He produced sound art which consists of video performance and sound works that have been featured in museums, galleries, television and on radio.

Life and family 
Born in Gateshead, County Durham, Routh grew up in a working-class family with parents that were considered rebellious talkers and storytellers. Routh's great-grandfather James Diston was a bare-knuckle prize fighter who also ran a circus. Routh attended the Bifron's Secondary Modern School in Barking, Essex, graduating in 1963. In Routh's youth, he participated in boxing, poetry and singing. He learned to play the piano, harmonium, organ, and later the drums. Routh played in a rock group as a drummer in the early 1960s and later performed as a singer/guitarist.
He attended East 15 Acting School where he met fellow student Martin von Haselberg. They became good friends, and together they created The Kipper Kids. They performed in small theatres, clubs and festivals in the Netherlands, Germany, Italy and Austria. They received an invitation to perform at the Munich Olympics as the Kipper Kids in 1972, which was marred by the Munich massacre.

Brian Routh was married to new media artist Nina Sobell from 1975 to 1981. Routh had taught at the San Francisco Art Institute where he met Karen Finley. They were married in 1981, which ended in divorce in 1987. Since 2009, Routh was partnered with digital artist Patricia Wells and they were married in 2012.

Routh lived in Leicester.

Performance artist
Routh started his career in 1971 as a performance artist. After inventing the character of Harry Kipper with Martin Von Haselberg on an acid trip in Frankfurt, they developed the iconic Kipper Kids. Routh embarked on solo work primarily in the mid-1970s. Von Haselberg and Routh reunited in 1977 to appear as the Kipper Kids in a film by Richard Elfman called Forbidden Zone, which was released in 1982.
In 1980 Routh began to perform as a solo artist again in between Kipper Kids appearances. He performed at Lincoln Center in New York City, as well as theatre festivals in Germany, Italy and at the Art Cologne.  In 1982 The Kipper Kids were cast in a unique variety show promoted by HBO, entitled "The Mondo Beyondo Show", featuring and hosted by Bette Midler. Routh was also involved in writing and starring in three projects for HBO and Cinemax, and he performed in several films alongside Van Haselberg as The Kipper Kids.

Collaborations
Routh has collaborated with and appeared with: The Kipper Kids; the Blue Man Group; Nina Sobell; Karen Finley (a 1981 tour of Italy and Germany); Henry Rollins (in Arizona, 1987); Public Image Ltd; Genesis P-Orridge; Sex Pistols (at Reading University, 1975); Johanna Went (at the Theatre Carnival); Sequel Cafe LA USA; Eric Bogosian; Anne Bean; Bow Gamelan Ensemble; Lol Coxhill; Evan Parker; Derek Bailey; Ian Hinchliffe.

Filmography and television

2000–2018
Routh worked primarily within the sound art genre on a variety of pieces combining video, performance and sound in the form of diaries, rants and sound works. He was also involved in activism and uses notable speakers, sampling their speeches and re-editing them to music he designed for the piece. His sound work has been featured on numerous BBC Radio shows and The Guardian weekly podcast.

References

External links
The Kipper Kids website

1948 births
2018 deaths
Alumni of East 15 Acting School
British performance artists
British sound artists
Deaths from cancer in England
People from Gateshead